Straussville is an unincorporated community in Richardson County, Nebraska, United States.

History
Straussville was platted in 1901. It was named for Gustave Strauss, the original owner of the town site.

A post office was established at Straussville in 1899, and remained in operation until it was discontinued in 1912.

References

Unincorporated communities in Richardson County, Nebraska
Unincorporated communities in Nebraska